Al-Madlaʽah is a village in Jabal Iyal Yazid District of 'Amran Governorate, Yemen. It is located west of 'Amran at the southern end of Jabal Iyal Yazid, overlooking the al-Bawn plain.

History 
Al-Madlaʽah often appears in historical texts under the spellings al-Maṭlaʽah or al-Maẓlaʽah, and is first mentioned in the year 1273 (672 AH). There is no indication that it was ever fortified, but it served as a military encampment or stopping place on several occasions throughout the late medieval/early modern period.

References 

Populated places in 'Amran Governorate